Ladislav Matetić (9 August 1927 – 24 February 2016) was a Croatian rower. He competed in the men's eight event at the 1952 Summer Olympics.

References

1927 births
2016 deaths
Croatian male rowers
Olympic rowers of Yugoslavia
Rowers at the 1952 Summer Olympics
People from Zlatibor District